Dantmara Union is a union parishad of Bhujpur Thana of Chittagong District, Bangladesh. It has an area of 23,474 acres (95 km2) and had a population of 75,000 in 2011. Baganbazar Union lies to the north, Manikchhari Upazila to the east, Narayanhat Union to the south and the Sitakunda mountain range to the west.

Education
 Dantmara A.B.Z Sikder High School (established 1967)
 Heako Banani High School
 Balutila Ideal High School
 Santirhat High School
 Hasnabad Madinatul Arab High School
 Heako Banani Degree College
 Dantmara Dakhil Madrases 
 Heako Rahmania Dakhil Madrasha
 Balutila Islamia Dakhil Madrasha
 Hasnabad Ahsanul Ulum Islamia Dakhil Madrasha
 Balutila Government Primary School
 Heako Government Primary School
 Dantmara Government Primary School
 Santirhat Government Primary School
 Jiltoli Government Primary School

Villages and mouzas
 Fulchari
 Purbo Sonai
 Banglapara
 Heako Purbo Para
 Heako (Chowdhury Para)
 Boro Betua
 Bandermara
 Dantmara
 Sadinagar
 Santirhat
 Hasnabad
 Gorkata
 Nurpur
 Tarakho
 Kalakum
 Jiltoli
 Morakoyla
 Balukhali
 Islampur
 Chapatoli

References

 

Unions of Bhujpur Thana